Julia Kein Wetherill Baker (July 15, 1858July 25, 1931) was an American writer and poet who wrote under the name Julie K. Wetherill and the initials J. K. W.

Biography
Julia Kein Wetherill was born in Woodville, Mississippi and educated in Philadelphia, Pennsylvania. In 1884 she moved to New Orleans where two years later she married Marion A. Baker, editor of the newspaper New Orleans Times-Democrat. In 1916, she was recorded as being Sunday editor of that newspaper. She wrote "Literary Pathways", a book review column, and "Innocent Bystander", a column concerning the theater and music, both of which appeared in the New Orleans newspapers. She published a number of short stories in publications including Lippincott's Monthly Magazine, The Atlantic Monthly, The Century Magazine, and The Critic, often under the name Julie K. Wetherill.

Baker's funeral was held in Christ Church Cathedral, and she was buried in Saint Louis Cemetery No. 3.

References

External links
 

1858 births
1931 deaths
People from Woodville, Mississippi
Writers from New Orleans
Writers from Mississippi
19th-century American poets
20th-century American poets
American women poets
19th-century American short story writers
20th-century American short story writers
American women short story writers
19th-century pseudonymous writers
20th-century pseudonymous writers
Pseudonymous women writers

Wikipedia articles incorporating text from A Woman of the Century
20th-century American women